Lieutenant Colonel Arthur Drummond Borton  (1 July 1883 – 5 January 1933) was an English recipient of the Victoria Cross, the highest award for gallantry in the face of the enemy that can be awarded to British and Commonwealth forces.

Biography
Borton was born at Cheveney, Kent to British officer Arthur Close Borton, the eldest son of Sir Arthur Borton and Adelaide Beatrice Drummond, a grandchild of Robert Kaye Greville. Borton was educated at Eton College and Sandhurst, before being commissioned into the King's Royal Rifle Corps in 1902 with whom he served in the Second Boer War. In 1908 he left the Army as unfit for general service.

At the start of the First World War, Borton was fruit farming in the United States. He returned to England and re-joined The King's Royal Rifles in 1914. After further service with the regiment he became an observer with The Royal Flying Corps in France, where he broke his neck in three places when his aircraft crashed and was declared unfit. Despite this he went to Gallipoli as a lieutenant commander in the Royal Naval Volunteer Reserve, where he won the Distinguished Service Order serving with the RNAS Armoured Cars. Borton was appointed Second-in-Command of the 2nd/22nd London Regiment (The Queen's) in June 1916, serving in France and Palestine.

He was a 34-year-old lieutenant colonel in the 2/22nd (County of London) Battalion, the London Regiment, British Army, when the following deed took place for which he was awarded the VC.

On 7 November 1917 at Palestine, Borton deployed his battalion for attack and at dawn led his companies against a strongly held position. When the leading waves were checked by withering fire, he moved freely up and down the line under heavy fire and then led his men forward, capturing the position. At a later stage he led a party of volunteers against a battery of field-guns in action at point-blank range, capturing the guns and the detachments. His fearless leadership was an example to the whole brigade.

He died on 5 January 1933 at Southwold in Suffolk, aged 49.

His Victoria Cross is displayed at the Queen's Royal Surrey Regiment Museum, Clandon Park, Guildford, Surrey.

Borton's younger brother was Air Vice Marshal Amyas Borton. He married Lorna Lockhart in 1915.

Honours and awards

References

 Kent Fallen
 Location of grave and VC medal
 The Queen's Royal Surrey Regimental Association entry on Borton

External links
Memoirs & Diaries – Tell-El-Sheria Diary entry that mentions Borton

1883 births
1933 deaths
Burials in Kent
People from Hunton, Kent
People educated at Eton College
Graduates of the Royal Military College, Sandhurst
Royal Navy officers
British World War I recipients of the Victoria Cross
British Army personnel of the Second Boer War
British Army personnel of World War I
London Regiment officers
Companions of the Distinguished Service Order
Companions of the Order of St Michael and St George
King's Royal Rifle Corps officers
Royal Navy officers of World War I
Royal Naval Volunteer Reserve personnel of World War I
British Army personnel of the Russian Civil War
Recipients of the Order of St. Vladimir, 4th class
British Army recipients of the Victoria Cross
Military personnel from Kent